Bangka may refer to:

 Bangka Island, an island of Indonesia
 Bangka Island (North Sulawesi)
 Bangka Regency, Indonesia
 Bangka Strait, a strait of Indonesia
 Wanhua District, Taipei City
 Bangka (boat), Philippine outrigger sailing ships, also spelled banca or panca
 Bangka language, spoken in Indonesia